Rhodanassa io is a moth of the family Depressariidae and the only species in the genus Rhodanassa. It is found in French Guiana.

The wingspan is about 37 mm. The forewings are glossy lilac-purple, the apical area beyond an undefined line from two-thirds of the costa to the tornus purplish-brown, the costa suffused with darker brown throughout. There is a grey-whitish quadrangular spot in the disc before the middle, a small oval black spot centred with brown-whitish and ringed with grey-whitish on the fold somewhat beyond this, and a rather large quadrangular black spot edged with grey-whitish and including a fine whitish line parallel to its posterior edge in the disc beyond the middle. There is a hardly perceptible faintly darker sinuate line from four-fifths of the costa to the tornus. The hindwings are bright deep rose. The forewings beneath have an elongate discal patch of light brassy-ochreous modified scales, extending over the upper part of the cell and above its margin from before the middle to the end, occupying about one-fourth of the width of the wing.

References

Moths described in 1915
Stenomatinae